Epigelasma rhodostigma is a species of moth of the  family Geometridae. It is found in East Madagascar.

The lengths of its forewings is 18mm. The upper side of its body is yellow-green, upperside of wings white largely mixed with yellow-green. The underside of the wings is white. It has one red cellular spot on the forewings and hindwings.

The holotype had been collected in East  Madagascar in the valley of Faraony River, Vohilava.

References

Geometrinae
Moths described in 1955
Lepidoptera of Madagascar
Moths of Madagascar
Moths of Africa